The 1999 Sedgefield Borough Council election to the Sedgefield Borough Council were held on 6 May 1999.  The whole council was up for election and the Labour Party stayed in overall control of the council.

Election result

|}

External links
1999 Sedgefield election result

1999
1999 English local elections
1990s in County Durham